The 2008 Korea National League Championship was the fifth competition of the Korea National League Championship. Amateur clubs Gumi Siltron and Icheon Hyundai Autonet were invited to the competition.

Group stage

Group A

Group B

Group C

Group D

Knockout stage

Bracket

Quarter-finals

Semi-finals

Final

See also
2008 in South Korean football
2008 Korea National League

References

External links

 

Korea National League Championship seasons
National Championship